The Gazebo is a 1959 American black comedy CinemaScope film about a married couple who are being blackmailed. It was based on the 1958 play of the same name by Alec Coppel and directed by George Marshall. Helen Rose was nominated for the Academy Award for Best Costume Design, Black-and-White. According to MGM financial records, the film earned $1,860,000 in North America and $1,450,000 elsewhere, making a profit of $628,000. It is also the last film released by MGM in the 1950s.

Plot
Television mystery writer and director Elliott Nash is blackmailed by Dan Shelby over nude photographs of his wife Nell, taken when she was 18 years old. Elliott does not inform Nell, the star of a Broadway musical, but works feverishly to pay off the increasing demands.

Finally, Elliott decides that murder is the only way out. He obtains advice from his friend, District Attorney Harlow Edison (Carl Reiner), who thinks he is helping with a mystery plot. When a figure presumed to be the blackmailer shows up at the Nashes' suburban home to collect his latest payment, Elliott shoots him, wraps the body in bathroom shower curtains, then hides it in the concrete foundation being poured for the antique gazebo his wife has bought. He struggles to keep Sam Thorpe, the contractor hired to install the structure, and Miss Chandler, the real estate agent trying to sell the Nashes' house, from stumbling across his scheme.

Edison brings news that Shelby has been shot dead in his hotel room, leaving Elliott wondering who he murdered. Nell's name is on a list of blackmail victims belonging to Shelby, so she and Elliott are both suspects. Shelby had approached Nell also, but she felt that if the photos were published, the publicity would be good for her. The Nashes are cleared when the murder weapon is found to belong to Joe the Black, an associate of Shelby's who collected payments. Police Lieutenant Jenkins realizes that Joe decided to steal all the money. Elliott is relieved to discover his victim was another criminal. However, two others were in the gang: the Duke and Louis the Louse, who kidnap Nell and take her to her home to find Joe the Black, who had $100,000 in a briefcase. They eventually figure out that the body is in the gazebo's foundation, now crumbling due to unexpected rain. They bring the body, wrapped in the shower curtains, into the Nash living room, and leave with the briefcase. When Elliott gets home, he unties his wife and confesses what he has done, moving the body to another room.

Soon, Lieutenant Jenkins shows up, having arrested the Duke and Louis. From what they have told him, Jenkins is sure that Elliott murdered Joe. Just as Elliott is about to confess, he sees that the bullet he fired missed Joe and ended up lodged in a book. A doctor confirms that Joe actually died of a pre-existing heart problem, and Elliott's pet pigeon Herman, who he had been nursing back to health after an injury, flies off with the bullet, so no evidence ties him to the death. As the police leave, Herman drops the bullet on Jekins' hat, which he discards in disgust, thinking he was hit by pigeon guano.

Cast
 Glenn Ford as Elliott Nash
 Debbie Reynolds as Nell Nash
 Carl Reiner as Harlow Edison
 John McGiver as Sam Thorpe
 Mabel Albertson as Miss Chandler
 Doro Merande as Matilda, the Nashes' servant
 Bert Freed as Lieutenant Joe Jenkins
 Martin Landau as The Duke
 Robert Ellenstein as Ben
 Dick Wessel as Louis the Louse (as Richard Wessel)
 James Gavin as Sgt. Drucker (uncredited)
 Stanley Adams as Dan Shelby, the blackmailer (uncredited)
 Harlan Warde as Dr Bradley (uncredited)
 ZaSu Pitts as Mrs MacGruder (scenes deleted)
 James Kirkwood Sr. as Mr MacGruder (scenes deleted)

Production
A comic subplot involves Alfred Hitchcock inadvertently assisting Elliott in a murder plan via telephone, while checking on a script Nash is writing for him.  The play's author Alec Coppel had written such a script for Hitchcock's film Vertigo.

See also
 List of American films of 1959

References

External links

 
 
 
 

1959 films
1950s black comedy films
American black comedy films
American black-and-white films
Films about screenwriters
American films based on plays
Films directed by George Marshall
Films set in Connecticut
Films set in New York City
Metro-Goldwyn-Mayer films
Films with screenplays by George Wells
1959 comedy films
1959 drama films
1950s English-language films
1950s American films